Anton Gelonkin (born  1964) was a Russian bank chairman who disappeared during the 1995 collapse of the Moscow City Bank and later convicted of running an international organised internet based fraud in 2006.

Moscow City Bank

Anton Dolgov was the chairman of the Moskovsky Gorodskoi Bank, or Moscow City Bank, and in late August 1995 disappeared after taking an unknown amount of money. The bank later collapsed with debts of 100 million US dollars.

Identity theft racket

British police believe that from 1996 Anton then ran an organised international operation based in Notting Hill, London that defrauded American, British and Spanish bank account holders, and "systematically defrauded clearing banks and other financial institutions in Britain and abroad" and ran undetected for ten years.

The gang used compromised credit cards to first buy electrical goods, which they had delivered to a double layer of mailbox addresses - to reduce the connection between the fraudsters and the goods - and then later sold them on eBay both inside and outside the UK. Other activities involved: using stolen card details to set up online gambling accounts and diverting the winnings; and directing stolen money to hundreds of bank accounts.

In late 2004 police had raided the gang's presence in Barcelona, arresting Andreas Fuhrmann and issuing an Interpol international arrest warrant for Anthony Peyton (alias Gelonkin).

In January 2005 police were called to a burglary associated with the gang's headquarters, and noted the name Gelonkin, and later discovered the Interpol warrant. This resulted in a raid which resulted in the arrest of Estonian Aleksei Kostap, but not before Kostap was able to trigger a system that encrypted the records held on the gang's computers. Despite police IT expert efforts the data has not been decrypted. Kostav was found guilty of conspiracy to defraud and perverting the course of justice. Another gang member, Lithuanian Romanos Vasilauskas, admitted possessing false passports with intent and sentenced to eighteen months. Anton Gelonkin, 'admitted conspiracies to defraud, to obtain services by deception, to acquire, use and possess criminal property, and to remove it "from the jurisdiction"' and was sentenced for six years.

Notes and references

1960s births
Living people
Russian fraudsters
Russian white-collar criminals
Internet fraud
Finance fraud
Russian people imprisoned abroad
Prisoners and detainees of England and Wales
People convicted of fraud